Roger Thomas (born August 19, 1947) is a former American college athletics administrator and American football coach.  He was  the athletic director at the University of Mary from 2008 to 2017. Thomas was previously the head football coach at Sioux Falls College—now known as the University of Sioux Falls—from 1976 to 1977 and at the University of North Dakota from 1986 to 1998.  He was also the athletic director at North Dakota  from 1999 to 2005. Subsequently, he served as the commissioner of the NCAA Division II's North Central Conference (NCC) from 2005 until the conference's demise in 2008.

Head coaching record

Football

References

1947 births
Living people
American football quarterbacks
American football running backs
Augustana (South Dakota) Vikings baseball coaches
Augustana (South Dakota) Vikings football coaches
Augustana (South Dakota) Vikings football players
Cal State Fullerton Titans football coaches
Mary Marauders athletic directors
Minnesota Golden Gophers football coaches
North Central Conference commissioners
North Dakota Fighting Hawks athletic directors
North Dakota Fighting Hawks football coaches
Sioux Falls Cougars football coaches
Toronto Argonauts coaches
University of South Dakota alumni
Sportspeople from Chicago
Players of American football from Chicago